The Kashmir flycatcher (Ficedula subrubra) is a small passerine bird in the flycatcher family Muscicapidae. At one time it was considered to be a subspecies of the red-breasted flycatcher, Ficedula parva.

This is an insectivorous species which breeds in the north-west Himalayas in the Kashmir region of the Indian Subcontinent. It is migratory and winters in the hills of central Sri Lanka and the Western Ghats of India. 

The Kashmir flycatcher breeds in deciduous forest with dense undergrowth, nesting in a hole in a tree and laying 3-5 eggs which are incubated by the female. It winters in gardens, tea estates, forest edges, and open areas within forest, generally above 750 m.

Most individuals leave the breeding grounds in September, arriving in Sri Lanka in October and departing again in late March. One of the best places to see this rare species is Victoria Park in Nuwara Eliya.

This species is 13 cm long. It is similar in shape to the slightly smaller red-breasted flycatcher. The male has a grey-brown back with an orange-red throat, breast and flanks, bordered with black on the throat and breast. Females and first-winter birds have slightly browner upperparts, and the red of the underparts may be reduced to just a pinkish wash.

The male of the similar taiga flycatcher, Ficedula albicilla, has the reddish-orange area limited to the throat and the top of the breast, and lacks the black border.

The song is a short melodic sweet-eet sweet-eet-did-he, and the call is a sharp chak.

This is a vulnerable species with a decreasing population and breeding range, which is also severely fragmented as a result of the destruction of temperate mixed deciduous forests by commercial timber extraction, agriculture and livestock grazing. The population is thought to be between 2,500 and 10,000 birds.

References

 Birds of India by Grimmett, Inskipp and Inskipp,

External links

Birds of South Asia
Kashmir flycatcher
Birds of Pakistan
Birds of North India
Kashmir flycatcher
Kashmir flycatcher
Birds of Nepal